Sarapong Kumsup (born 9 November 1970) is a Thai sprinter. He competed in the men's 4 × 400 metres relay at the 1992 Summer Olympics.

References

1970 births
Living people
Athletes (track and field) at the 1992 Summer Olympics
Sarapong Kumsup
Sarapong Kumsup
Place of birth missing (living people)
Asian Games medalists in athletics (track and field)
Sarapong Kumsup
Athletes (track and field) at the 1994 Asian Games
Medalists at the 1994 Asian Games
Sarapong Kumsup
Sarapong Kumsup